Petter Augustsson (born 24 June 1980) is a  Swedish retired footballer who played as a goalkeeper

References

Living people
1980 births
Swedish footballers
Association football goalkeepers
Umeå FC players
Ängelholms FF players
Östersunds FK players